Kenneth Walter Bone (born May 21, 1958) is an American basketball coach, currently the associate head coach at Pepperdine University.

Coaching career
Born in Seattle,  Bone attended Shorecrest High School in Shoreline, Washington. His father Walt was a high school basketball coach. Ken Bone played junior college basketball at Shoreline Community College and Edmonds Community College before transferring to Seattle Pacific University in 1980 and playing there as a reserve guard for two years. Bone graduated from Seattle Pacific  in 1983 with a bachelor's degree in physical education and later completed a master's in athletic administration from the same university in 1993.

Bone was an assistant coach at Shorecrest High School and Cal State Stanislaus before returning to Seattle Pacific as an assistant coach in 1986, becoming head coach in 1990. In twelve years at Seattle Pacific, he compiled a 252–98 record and made 8 appearances in the NCAA Division II tournament, reaching the semifinals in 2000.  From 2002 to 2005, Bone was an assistant coach at Washington under Lorenzo Romar, where he helped recruit all-time Huskies rebounding leader and former NBA player Jon Brockman, who was coached by Bone's older brother, Len Bone, the Snohomish High School boys' basketball coach.

In 2005, Ken Bone became head coach at Portland State and was selected as the 2007–08 Big Sky Conference Men's Basketball Coach of the Year after taking the Vikings to their first ever NCAA tournament. In 2009, Bone coached the Vikings to a second consecutive appearance in the NCAA tournament. In four years with Portland State, Bone compiled a 77–49 record.

In 2009, Bone accepted an offer to become the head coach at Washington State. He signed a 7-year contract.

Bone was dismissed from the WSU Basketball program on March 18 of 2014 when Athletic Director, Bill Moos, elected to pay off the remaining two years on his seven-year contract. This was following a 2014 campaign that saw the Cougars go 10–21 overall and 3–15 in conference play.

After leaving WSU, Bone spent two years as an associate head coach at Montana, then joined Gonzaga as a special assistant to head coach Mark Few for the 2016–17 season. Bone was once again hired by Lorenzo Romar, this time as associate head coach at Pepperdine on March 13, 2018.

Bone has been recognized nationally as a top offensive-minded coach both as assistant and head coach. His teams at Seattle Pacific University, Portland State, and Washington State routinely ranked amongst the nation's elite in offensive efficiency.

Head coaching record
Sources for Seattle Pacific:

Sources for Portland State and Washington State:

References

External links
Washington State bio

1958 births
Living people
Basketball coaches from Washington (state)
Basketball players from Seattle
College men's basketball head coaches in the United States
High school basketball coaches in Washington (state)
Montana Grizzlies basketball coaches
Pepperdine Waves men's basketball coaches
Portland State Vikings men's basketball coaches
Seattle Pacific Falcons men's basketball coaches
Seattle Pacific Falcons men's basketball players
Shoreline Dolphins men's basketball players
Stanislaus State Warriors men's basketball coaches
Washington Huskies men's basketball coaches
Washington State Cougars men's basketball coaches
American men's basketball players